Herschel Park is a public park in Upton, a suburb of Slough in Berkshire. It is owned and managed by Slough Borough Council. It is in two adjacent areas. The more formal area in the north is a Grade II listed park.

Geography and site
The parkland has two lakes and ponds. The larger lake features an island planted with mature trees. The park also features a set of mature specimen and ornamental trees.

History
The park has been in existence from at least 1843, when James Bedborough bought the land in the area and used it to built twenty-nine terraced houses and large villas that looked out over the park. It is believed that Sir Joseph Paxton laid out the original park grounds. The park when opened was called Upton Park.

In 1949, the park was sold to Slough Borough Council. In 1952 the council changed its name from Upton Park Pleasure Grounds to Herschel Park, after the astronomer Sir William Herschel. In 1962–63, Slough Corporation purchased a further 10 acres from Eton College, which by 1982 had become part of Herschel  Park.

In 2000, the water in the lakes suddenly disappeared, and a group was set up called Friends of Herschel Park, who together with Slough Borough Council started to apply for funds to return the park to its original Victorian design. In January 2009 the park was granted £2.7 million of council and lottery funding by the Heritage Lottery Fund. In 2011 work was finished; the lakes were refilled with water, and the original paths were restored.

In 2013, the site was declared as a local nature reserve by Slough Borough Council.

Fauna
The site has the following fauna:

Mammals
European rabbit
Eastern gray squirrel
Reeves's muntjac
Red fox
Common pipistrelle
Field vole

Invertebrates
Gerridae
Comma butterfly
Araneus diadematus
Stag beetle
Six-spot burnet
Chorthippus parallelus
Meadow brown
Libellula depressa

Birds
European green woodpecker
Mandarin duck
Mallard
Canada goose
Common blackbird
Eurasian blue tit
European robin
Cetti's warbler
Common kestrel
Moorhen
Egyptian goose
Great spotted woodpecker
Song thrush

Amphibians & reptiles
Common frog
Anguis fragilis

Flora
The site has the following flora:

Trees
Fraxinus excelsior
Cedrus deodara
Aesculus hippocastanum
Taxodium distichum
Quercus robur
Quercus ilex
Lucombe oak
Turkey oak
Araucaria araucana
Taxus baccata
Ilex aquifolium

Plants
Galanthus nivalis
Myosotis
Papaver rhoeas
Leucanthemum vulgare
Lotus corniculatus
Centaurea nigra
Mentha aquatica
Lychnis flos-cuculi
Caltha palustris

References

Parks and open spaces in Berkshire
Nature reserves in Berkshire
Local Nature Reserves in Berkshire
Slough